In Riemannian geometry, the geodesic curvature  of a curve  measures how far the curve is from being a geodesic. For example, for 1D curves on a 2D surface embedded in 3D space, it is the curvature of the curve projected onto the surface's tangent plane. In particular geodesics on  have zero geodesic curvature (they are "straight"), so that , which explains why they appear to be curved in ambient space whenever the submanifold is.

Definition
Consider a curve  in a manifold , parametrized by arclength, with unit tangent vector . Its curvature is the norm of the covariant derivative of : .

If the ambient manifold is the euclidean space , then the covariant derivative  is just the usual derivative .

Example
Let  be the unit sphere  in three-dimensional Euclidean space. Great circles have curvature , so they have zero geodesic curvature, and are therefore geodesics. Smaller circles of radius  will have curvature  and geodesic curvature .

Some results involving geodesic curvature

The geodesic curvature is none other than the usual curvature of the curve when computed intrinsically in the submanifold .
In general Riemannian geometry, the derivative is computed using the Levi-Civita connection  of the ambient manifold: . It splits into a tangent part and a normal part to the submanifold: .
The Gauss–Bonnet theorem.

See also
 Curvature
 Darboux frame
 Gauss–Codazzi equations

References 

 .
 .

External links
 

Geodesic (mathematics)
Manifolds